was a small  minelayer of the Imperial Japanese Navy, which was in service during World War II. She was named after Sarushima Island, a small island in Tokyo Bay, offshore Yokosuka, Kanagawa. She was designed as an auxiliary minelayer and escort vessel.

Building
Sarushima was a slightly enlarged version of the Natsushima-class, with the same armament, but with diesel engines. Sarushima was launched by the Mitsubishi Yokohama shipyards on December 16, 1933, and was commissioned into service on July 20, 1934.

Operational history
On completion, Sarushima was assigned to the Yokosuka Naval District. After the start of the Second Sino-Japanese War, she was dispatched to patrol the inland waters of China, and was based at Jiujiang under the China Expeditionary Fleet on July 1, 1938.

At the time of the attack on Pearl Harbor in December 1941, Sarushima was assigned to the Yokosuka Guard District, remaining in Japanese home waters for most of the duration of the war, and occasionally escorting convoys to the Bonin Islands.

On April 15, 1944, Sarushima departed Tokyo with a convoy for Saipan, returning safety on May 4. On May 17, she departed with another convoy for Saipan and Guam. Sarushima launched depth charges, but failed to sink either submarine.

On June 28, Sarushima escorted a convoy from Tokyo to Chichijima in the Bonin Islands. On the return voyage, the convoy was attacked by United States Navy (USN) carrier-based aircraft, which sunk all of the ships in the convoy, including Sarushima at position . Sarushima was removed from the Navy List on September 10, 1944.

References

Notes

Books

External links

Minelayers of the Imperial Japanese Navy
World War II mine warfare vessels of Japan
Ships sunk by US aircraft
Ships built by Mitsubishi Heavy Industries
1933 ships
Maritime incidents in July 1944
World War II shipwrecks in the Philippine Sea